Feature films about the World War II incarceration of Japanese Americans include:
 American Pastime (2007) Focuses on internees' use of baseball as a source of entertainment while living in camp
 Bad Day at Black Rock (1955)
 Come See the Paradise (1990) Follows an interracial family separated by the wartime incarceration program
 Day of Independence (2003) A Nisei teen immerses himself in baseball after his parents decide to return to Japan rather than remain in camp in the U.S.
 Farewell to Manzanar (1976) Made for television adaptation of Jeanne Wakatsuki Houston's memoirs of her time in the Manzanar internment camp
 Forgotten Valor (2001) Written and directed by Lane Nishikawa, a Nisei veteran remembers his experiences during World War II
 Go for Broke! (1951) Based on the real-life story of the 442nd Regimental Combat Team, a segregated army unit of Japanese American men, many of whom served while their families were incarcerated on the home front
 Go for Broke: An Origin Story (2018) Follows a group of University of Hawaii ROTC students during the tumultuous year after the attack on Pearl Harbor, as they navigate wartime Hawaii and fight discrimination. Adaptation of the comic book by Stacey Hayashi
 Hell to Eternity (1960) Biopic about Guy Gabaldon, a Mexican American Marine who was adopted by a Japanese American family at age 12 and went on to serve in World War II while his adoptive family was interned in Manzanar
 If Tomorrow Comes (1971) Made-for-TV movie following the romance between a Nisei man and a white woman at the start of World War II
 99 Years of Love 〜Japanese Americans〜 (2010)
 Kommando 1944 (2018)
 Only the Brave (2006)
 Snow Falling on Cedars (1999) Adaptation of the novel by David Guterson
 Stand Up for Justice: The Ralph Lazo Story (2004)
 Strawberry Fields (1997)
 The Magic of Ordinary Days (2005)
 Under the Blood Red Sun (2014) A 13 yr old Japanese boy faces monumental adversity in 1941 Hawaii, when the Japanese bomb Pearl Harbor. Adaptation of the novel by Graham Salisbury

See also
 List of documentary films about the Japanese American internment

References

 
Japanese-American internment
Japanese-American internment